The Maples is a provincial electoral division in the Canadian province of Manitoba. The riding was created by redistribution in 1989, has been represented in the Legislative Assembly of Manitoba since the provincial election of 1990. It is located in the north end of Winnipeg. The riding is bordered by Kildonan to the east, Inkster to the west, Burrows to the south and Gimli to the north.

The riding's population in 1996 was 19,234. The average family income in 1999 was $45,853, with an unemployment rate of 9.30%.  25% of the riding's residents are categorized as low-income.

The Maples has the second-highest immigrant population in Manitoba, at 32.6% of the total. Its ethnic base is diverse; 12% of the riding's residents are Filipino, 8% are Ukrainian, 7% are East Indian, 3% are Italian, and a further 3% are Chinese.  Manufacturing jobs accounted for 20% of the riding's industry in 1999.

Members of the Legislative Assembly

Electoral results

Previous boundaries

References

Maples, The
Maples, The